Frank Coleman may refer to:

Frank Coleman (businessman) (born 1953), Newfoundland and Labrador businessman
Frank Coleman (counselor) (1912–2008), educator and community volunteer.
Frank Joseph Coleman (1886–1934), U.S. federal judge
Frank J. Coleman (1888–1948), American silent film actor
Francis Coleman (1924–2008), conductor and television producer
Frank "Weinie" Coleman, outlaw killed by Vernon C. Miller
Frank Coleman, co-founder of Omega Psi Phi

See also
 Frank Colman (1918–1983), Canadian Major League Baseball player